Joanna Rajkowska (born 1968) is a Polish contemporary artist who came onto the Polish art scene in the 1990s. Her most famous work is called "Greetings from Jerusalem Avenue", a 15-meter-tall (50-foot) artificial palm tree installed on Warsaw's Jerusalem Avenue.

The installation was organized by the Warsaw Centre for Contemporary Art (13 December 2002 – 13 December 2003). Since then, the palm tree has become a permanent fixture of Warsaw, as it was not removed at the end of the official exhibition but instead came under the protection of the President of Warsaw.

It went neglected and leafless two years later, until the artist and friends mounted its restoration. It still stands in the center of the city. In the summer of 2007, the palm underwent a complete makeover, becoming more weatherproof and easier to maintain (unlike natural palms, its fronds require periodic manual replacement).

Life

Born in Bydgoszcz, Poland, Joanna Rajkowska studied painting at the Academy of Fine Arts in Kraków, Poland (1988–1993), and art history at Jagiellonian University, Kraków, Poland (1988–1993). She also completed the Studio Semester Program at the State University of New York, U.S. (1994–1995).

Work
Rajkowska describes the sense of her activity as building relationships with other people. She often only sets up the context of a meeting, allowing it to be an open experience. She usually engages a number of people as participants, and she also uses herself in her work.  For example, in Satisfaction Guaranteed, her body was being symbolically consumed by other people .

Palm
Greetings from Jerusalem Avenue – the 15-meter (50-foot) tall artificial palm tree installed in the centre of Warsaw – an installation created by Rajkowska after her trip with Artur Żmijewski to Israel in the spring of 2001. It is an attempt to infuse with Israel's scenery Warsaw's Jerusalem Avenue – a street whose name and history, in return, sends the observer back to Israel. In another way, the palm tree refers to a popular idiomatic expression in the Polish language ( – literally: "the palm tree sprouts/bounces back") that indicates something unthinkable, outside common understanding, escaping the usual way of reasoning, simply – something idiotic. On the other hand, through the very presence of the palm tree in the middle of Warsaw's centre, it may signify that the commonly accepted way of reasoning does not fit the real world.

Exhibitions

 2012 Born in Berlin, 7th Berlin Biennale, Berlin, Germany
 2008 Spitoon Zachęta, Warsaw, Poland
 2007 Oxygenator, (public project), Warsaw, Poland
 2005 Twenty-Two Tasks, Program Gallery, Warsaw, Poland
 2004 Only Love, (public project), Warsaw, Poland
 2003 Formal Promise. Artist For Rent, Mullerdechiara Gallery, Berlin, Germany
 2002 Greetings from Jerusalem Avenue, (public project), Warsaw, Poland
 2002 My Great-Grandmother Rosa Stern, (Photofestival), Skulpturen Hus, Stockholm, Sweden
 2001 Stockholm International Art Fair, Stockholm, Sweden
 2000 The Diary of Dreams, XX1 Gallery, Warsaw, Poland
 2000 Satisfaction Guaranteed, Centre for Contemporary Art, Ujazdowski Castle, Warsaw, Poland
 2000 Satisfaction Guaranteed, AMS – Outdoor Gallery, 400 billboards all over Poland
 1999 On Saturday I Eat Sweets and I Masturbate, Open Gallery, Kraków, Poland
 1999 Things I Do In the Evenings, Manhattan Gallery, Łódź, Poland
 1998 Menu of Desires, Bunkier Sztuki Gallery, Kraków, Poland
 1998 The Love of a Man Named Dog, Contemporary Art Gallery Zachęta, Warsaw, Poland
 1997 Lobster Lovers, Hallwalls Contemporary Art Center, Buffalo, New York, USA
 1996 Trio for Skin, Voice and the Madman, Bucklein Theatre, Kraków, Poland
 1996 Water-Tower. Headache, Centre for Contemporary Art, Warsaw, Poland
 1995 No Sign of Dying Soon. The Past – the Physical Presence, State University of NY, NYC, USA
 1995 Irritation, Zderzak Gallery, Kraków, Poland
 1994 Fluids, Zderzak Gallery, Kraków, Poland

Awards
 2001 The Ministry of Culture and National Heritage Scholarship, Poland
 1998 The Civitella Ranieri Fellowship
 1997 The Skowhegan School of Painting and Sculpture Fellowship
 1996 The ArtsLink Partnership, Buffalo, USA
 President's Award of the City of Kraków, Kraków, Poland

See also

Profile at culture.pl

References

 Satisfaction Guaranteed exhibition in The Centre for Contemporary Art, Warsaw, Poland
 A WATER-TOWER. A HEADACHE. exhibition in Laboratorium Gallery, The Centre for Conterporary Art, Warsaw, Poland
 Official website of Joanna Rajkowska 
 Official website of the Greetings from Jerusalem Avenue palm tree (Palma) 
 Joanna Rajkowska at the gallery Żak | Branicka

1968 births
Living people
Jagiellonian University alumni
Polish contemporary artists
Artificial trees